Kabal is a fictional character in the Mortal Kombat fighting game franchise by Midway Games and NetherRealm Studios. He debuted in Mortal Kombat 3 (1995) as a former member of the Black Dragon criminal organization. Chosen by the thunder god Raiden to help defend Earthrealm, he pursues redemption by battling invading forces from Outworld. Subsequent installments, however, give Kabal a more good depiction as the leader of a new Black Dragon clan in the original timeline because of the brainwash by Kano, and a villainous depiction as an undead revenant in the reboot. Due to injuries suffered against Outworld's warriors, the character wears a specialized helmet with a built-in life-support system. He possesses superhuman speed and uses a pair of hookswords as his primary weapon.

Reception to Kabal has been mostly positive, with him regarded as one of the franchise's most powerful fighters, although his Fatality finishing moves have been more scrutinized. He has also appeared in various media outside of the games.

Appearances

Mortal Kombat games
Making his debut in 1995's Mortal Kombat 3, Kabal was a member of the Black Dragon crime syndicate alongside Kano until Outworld emperor Shao Kahn's invasion of Earthrealm. After the thunder god Raiden chose him to help defend Earthrealm, Kabal became a target of the Kahn's extermination squads, who subjected him to a vicious attack that left him badly maimed and scarred; forcing him thereafter to rely on artificial respirators for survival and a mask to hide his now disfigured face. However, the assault had also resulted in Kabal abandoning his life of crime in order to fight alongside the Earthrealm warriors and successfully thwart Shao Kahn and his forces.

As was the case with the debuting characters from MK3 onward, Kabal is not playable in Mortal Kombat Deadly Alliance (2002), though he has a significant role in the game's storyline when he is killed in battle and has his hook swords stolen by Mavado, a leading member of the Black Dragon's rival, the Red Dragon clan. This storyline briefly continues in Mortal Kombat: Deception (2004), when Kabal hunts and defeats Mavado and takes back his swords. Beforehand, a cleric of the otherworldly dimension Chaosrealm, Havik, brought Kabal back from the brink of death and instructed him to restore the same Black Dragon that he had long tried to disassociate himself from. Kabal complies, recruiting Kira, who had impressed him by being able to do business with extremist terrorist organizations despite her gender, and martial artist turned killer Kobra after freeing him from police custody. At Havik's request, Kabal brings his recruits to Outworld and, as depicted in his ending, assigns them to distract the Earthrealm heroes while Havik slays the Dragon King Onaga and takes his heart, which has the power to raise the dead. However, Kabal kills Havik and takes the organ for himself.

In 2005 beat 'em up title Mortal Kombat: Shaolin Monks, a retelling of the events leading up to Mortal Kombat II, a non-playable Kabal was the subject of an optional mission, during which he left the player his hookswords to use.

Due to never receiving an official biography in Mortal Kombat: Armageddon (2006), Kabal and his recruits do not play a significant role in the game's plot. In his ending, he confronts Mavado one last time in order to end their rivalry. Kabal emerges victorious in battle, resulting in Mavado killing himself. Kabal does make an appearance with Kira and Kobra in the game's training mode when he confronts the demigod Taven after the latter defeats Kobra and other Black Dragon thugs. Impressed, Kabal offers him a chance to join the Black Dragon, but Taven refuses. Kabal challenges him to combat in response, but is defeated.

In the 2011 Mortal Kombat reboot, an alternate-timeline retelling of the first three games, Kabal is a reformed Black Dragon member turned NYPD's riot-control officer alongside Kurtis Stryker. Amidst the chaos of Shao Kahn's invasion of Earthrealm, they confront and defeat Outworld warriors Reptile and Mileena, but Kabal is severely burned by the Shokan Kintaro and kidnapped by Kano. Despite Kabal leaving the Black Dragon, Kano restores his health with the sorcerer Shang Tsung's help, though with a respirator and mask as Kabal's lungs are damaged beyond repair. He is horrified by his condition and irate with Kano for supporting Outworld. After defeating him, he demands his former leader take him to Shao Kahn, where they witness the emperor promote his wife Sindel to general of his armies before Kabal knocks Kano unconscious and escapes back to Earthrealm. Following this, Raiden invites him to join his band of Earthrealm warriors, but while he and his ally Liu Kang commune with the Elder Gods, Sindel and the Lin Kuei ninja clan ambush the Earthrealm defenders, killing them all. They are all subsequently resurrected by the necromancer Quan Chi as undead revenant slaves. The undead Kabal returns in Mortal Kombat X (2015) as a non-playable character with a minor role in the story's plot.

Kabal returned as a playable character in Mortal Kombat 11 (2019). In the game's story mode, the present Kabal remains a revenant and serves the keeper of time Kronika. After she causes a time anomaly as part of her plan to eliminate Raiden from history, she brings a past version of Kabal who was still aligned with the Black Dragon to the present. He subsequently joins Kano, who manipulates him into fighting Sonya Blade by falsely claiming she was responsible for scarring him in the future.

Character design and gameplay

Kabal was nicknamed "Sandman" during the production of Mortal Kombat 3 before his actual name was determined. According to Mortal Kombat co-creator John Tobias, Kabal's overall design was inspired by the Tusken Raiders from Star Wars, while the circular lenses of his mask were inspired by 1940s-style aviator goggles. The developers had also been interested at the possibility of introducing a character with a disability into the series.
Kabal was originally given wrist-mounted buzzsaw blades as his primary weapon before his familiar hookswords, while Boon cited his favorite comic book character as a youth, Flash, as the inspiration for Kabal's "Tornado" move, which dizzied opponents and set them up for a free hit. According to Boon, Kabal was overpowered enough in MK3 in regards to his special moves that the developers had to tone him down in future updates. In Deception and onward, Kabal is seen with a long, sleeveless trenchcoat and a backpack (with antenna) that supported his breathing apparatus, the former which Midway had been forced to omit from MK3 due to memory limitations and the potential problem of the movement of the coat interfering with gameplay.

A pre-scarred Kabal was to be included in the 2000 spin-off title Mortal Kombat: Special Forces as a boss character, but he was cut from the game after it underwent many last-minute changes due to time constraints exacerbated by the sudden departure of Tobias from Midway.

Kabal's masked face was the only telltale sign of his wounds in his series appearances up until the reboot, which now conspicuously featured the grotesque imagery of his charred skin. In an interview with Spike TV in March 2011 that revealed the first look at the character for the game, Boon explained that he wanted to keep all of Kabal's classic offensive moves while coming up with graphic Fatalities that the developers felt would be "crossing the line." Tobias, however, expressed his dissatisfaction with his original designs of Kabal and Stryker in a 2012 interview with The On Blast Show: "If I could go back and redo Kabal and Stryker, I would. I don't know if I'd design them differently or just come up with new characters [in their place]."

Kabal was considered to be overpowered in Mortal Kombat 3; Bryan Dawson of Prima Games commented that he "was that one character that all of the novice players used to try to get easy wins."

Other media
Kabal appeared in one episode of the 1996 animated series Mortal Kombat: Defenders of the Realm, which followed his MK3 storyline of his betraying Kano and the Black Dragon, as well as his injuries suffered at the hands of Kahn's forces and the resulting aftermath. He was voiced by Kevin Michael Richardson.

He is mentioned by name in the 1997 film Mortal Kombat: Annihilation along with Stryker as "two of Earth's best warriors" who were captured by Rain, but neither actually appeared onscreen. They were given detailed roles in the first draft of the script, in which they are prisoners slaving away in an Outworld cobalt mine that is overseen by Baraka. After Liu Kang infiltrates the prison and rescues Kitana after killing Baraka in battle, Kabal and Stryker organize the revolting prisoners in fighting off the guards.

In a September 2013 interview with Fearnet, director Kevin Tancharoen revealed that he had wanted to include Kabal in his Mortal Kombat: Legacy web series, but was hampered by budget limitations coupled with the complexities of the character's backstory and physical appearance. 

Kabal plays a minor role in the 2021 Mortal Kombat reboot film as a rival of Kano, and is seen carrying a police badge belonging to Stryker. He wa played by Australian stuntman Daniel Nelson and voiced by Damon Herriman.

The character appears in the 2022 animated film Mortal Kombat Legends: Snow Blind as a member of the Black Dragon alongside Kano. He is voiced by Keith Silverstein.

Reception
Kabal placed nineteenth on UGO's 2012 list of the top 50 Mortal Kombat characters, and Complex ranked Kabal as the sixteenth-"most brutal" out of twenty series characters in 2013. "The fact that he was once a member of the Black Dragon clan; his superhuman speed and his fatalities, all contribute to his ruthlessness." Gavin Jasper of Den of Geek ranked Kabal twelfth in his 2015 ranking of the 77 playable series characters, but felt his "main quality is his complete lack of conviction." Entertainment Weekly rated Kabal as the second-best character from Mortal Kombat 3 in a 20th-anniversary ranking of the game's playable roster in 2015. "Trendy misspelled name? Check. Unnecessary kneepads? Check. Tragic beaten-half-to-death backstory that requires the constant presence of a cyber-respirator? Check."

Kabal's Fatalities from MK3 have been collectively considered among the worst in the series. However, Prima Games included the "Head Inflation" from the game among their 2014 compilation of the series' top fifty Fatalities, while UGO rated it among their 2012 list of the "top eleven" series Fatalities. His "It Takes Guts" Fatality from the 2011 reboot was included on the International Business Times list of the top ten Fatalities from the game, and GameRant placed it sixth in their 2011 list of the game's best finishers.

Screen Rant noted Kabal in the 2021 Mortal Kombat film for "his striking appearance" and "fully armored look with glowing red eyes [that] was memorable and effective," but the Washington Post said, "Sadly, he’s another ... bad-guy bodyguard, and yet another victim of a very crowded film."

Notes

References

Fictional Gōjū-ryū practitioners
Fictional New York City Police Department officers
Fictional characters with disfigurements
Fictional criminals in video games
Fictional police officers in video games
Fictional swordfighters in video games
Male characters in video games
Male film villains
Male video game villains
Mortal Kombat characters
Video game antagonists
Video game characters introduced in 1995
Video game characters who can move at superhuman speeds
Zombie and revenant characters in video games